The Pinksterlanddagen (Pentecost days) is the largest anarchist event in the Netherlands. It is a long tradition that goes back to 1924 when anarchist young people from Frisia organized this meeting for the first time. In 1933, the campground in Appelscha was bought by anti-militarist workers, and it is here that the festival has taken place ever since, every year during the Pentecost on the anarchist, alcohol-free camping site Tot Vrijbezzinnen.

History 

The Frisian town of Appelscha has a long tradition of radical revolutionary socialism and anarchism, which started on March 30, 1889 when the anarchist Ferdinand Domela Nieuwenhuis gave a speech to the village's dissatisfied workers. Since then, the village has had a reputation as a stronghold of socialism and anarchism. Here the combative agricultural workers formed the basis for the activities of Nieuwenhuis, workers strikes often took place in the village and around 1900 there was a large wave of strikes.

The local anarchist youth organized a Pinksterlanddagen event for the first time in 1924 on the "Ter Vrijheidsbezinning" site (literally: "For Freedom of Mind"). 

In 1970 the  Provo Roel van Duijn attended the  Pinksterlanddagen  and organized a teach-in as the culmination of a propaganda manifestation for anarchism and for all anti-authoritarian movements in the Netherlands:  pacifists,  council communists,  socialists and others.

Event 
The "Stichting tot vrijheidsbezinning" (literally:  Foundation for the Freedom of Contemplation ), which manages or organizes the Pinksterlanddagen, attaches importance to the fact that the visitors respect the freedoms of their fellow human beings. The initiative participants assume that all event participants feel jointly responsible as users of the site and have set up some rules for this: There are various containers for paper, glass and chemical waste in the village that should be used. There is also a container for normal waste in front of the site and a container for organic waste. No open fires on or around the campsite as there is a forest nearby. The site is accessible day and night, so make no noise at night. The terrain  Ter Vrijheidsbezinning  is  antimilitaristic, alcohol and other drugs are not allowed. Energy saving measures should be observed. Other libertarian groups are also welcome. A large building is available for readings, events, workshops, meetings and more. Participation in the  Pinksterlanddagen is not free of charge. There are also other tariffs for visitors who want to come before or after the  Pinksterlanddagen  event. The group "Rampeplan" (literally:  Disaster Plan ) provides warm meals. 

According to the anarchist-communist principle "From each according to their ability, to each according to their needs", leftover and well-preserved food items are put on a long table after the event, so they can be packed and taken away. Since the Pinksterlanddagen was founded, the events have been “alcohol-free”. Visitors are welcome all year round at the Ter Vrijheidsbezendung campsite, which is managed by a permanent employee.

References

Bibliography 
 Vries de Theun: The Wiarda Noorderzon family, "The wheel of fortune." In the chapter "Stepmother Earth" about the Pinksterland days and the "Domelapad" walking route. Em. Querido's Publisher, Amsterdam 1980, .
 H .W. van den Doel: Places of memory. The Netherlands in the twentieth century . With Article von Henk te Velde über F.D. Nieuwenhuis und those  Pentecost days . Promotheus / Bert Bakker, Amsterdam 2005, .
 J. R. G. Schuur:  Appelscha. Stronghold of Anarchism and Radical Socialism.  .
 A. J. Dijkstra: "Civitas Civics". Workbook. Garant, Antwerp / Apeldorn 2007, P. 37.
 In the State Archives by International Institute of Social History. Under: “Pinksterlanddagen”:  Material magazines, pamphlets, program data, publications from the Netherlands. Period 1976-2006 . Organizations: GroenFront; Environmentally Active Youth (JMA); Anti-Fascist Action (AFA); Right for All; Animal Liberation Front (ALF).
 Ferdinand D. Nieuwenhuis and the Pinksterlanddagen. Chapter 2. "The Pentecostal Days and the Grounds for Reflection on Freedom."

Further reading 

 

Anarchism in the Netherlands
Annual events in the Netherlands